The 1st Aerobic Gymnastics European Championships was held in Birmingham, United Kingdom, December 02–05, 1999.

Results

Medal table

References
Results (archived)
Participants (archived)
Results 2

Aerobic Gymnastics European Championships
1999 in gymnastics
International sports competitions in Birmingham, West Midlands
International gymnastics competitions hosted by the United Kingdom
1999 in English sport